Westwell is a village and relatively elevated civil parish with a population of 740 (2001), centred  north of Ashford in Kent, England, in the Borough of Ashford.

The Pilgrims' Way runs close to the village on the Downs and was travelled by pilgrims on their way to Canterbury.  The M20 motorway and High Speed 1 pass through the long south-west outskirts of the parish.

History
Westwell is a rural village in the North Downs Area of Outstanding Natural Beauty at the foot of the Westwell Downs, the highest part of which is called the Beacon after the chain of beacons erected to signal the approach of the Spanish Armada. The village was first mentioned in 858 in a Saxon document and was included in the Domesday Book. A weekly market was held here under a licence granted by Edward I, there was a park during Edward II's time and later a vineyard tended by monks (recalled by one of the cottages in the village named Vineyards).

The centre of the village is a conservation area with many mature trees and listed buildings, including Court Lodge, Swinford Cottage, Periton Court and The Mill House. The notable parish church is St. Mary the Virgin which dates from the 13th century or earlier.  Among many other buildings of interest in the parish are Ripple Court (which used to house the local dungeons—and where it is alleged that Jack Cade was captured) and The Haven (pronounced 'harven') a Tudor residence where Elizabeth I is believed to have spent one night. The village was formerly served by Hothfield for Westwell railway station on the Maidstone Line. Kent Gliding Club is nearby.

References

External links

 Westwell Community website
http://westwellparish.btck.co.uk/Parishmap Statistical/Civil Parish map subpage (shows parts of Tutt Hill and Potter's Corner falling into Westwell)

Villages in Kent
Villages in the Borough of Ashford
Civil parishes in Ashford, Kent